Danylo Yevhenovych Honcharuk (born 13 July 2002) is a Ukrainian professional footballer who plays as a centre-forward for El Ejido on loan  from Shakhtar Donetsk.

References

External links
 
 

2002 births
Living people
Sportspeople from Kropyvnytskyi
Piddubny Olympic College alumni
Ukrainian footballers
Ukraine youth international footballers
Ukraine under-21 international footballers
Association football forwards
FC Shakhtar Donetsk players
FC Mariupol players
Lleida Esportiu footballers
CD El Ejido players
Segunda Federación players
Ukrainian expatriate footballers
Expatriate footballers in Spain
Ukrainian expatriate sportspeople in Spain